Carl Andrew Weinman (January 27, 1903 – February 5, 1979) was a United States district judge of the United States District Court for the Southern District of Ohio.

Early life and education

Weinman was born in Steubenville, Jefferson County, Ohio on January 27, 1903, the son of Andrew G. and Dorothea (Becker) Weinman. A musically-talented trumpet player in his youth, he joined the musician's union at the age of 14 and worked his way through the University of Michigan, directing the marching band for two years. Weinman received his Artium Baccalaureus degree from the University of Michigan in 1924, and a Juris Doctor from the University of Michigan Law School in 1926.

Career

Weinman was admitted to the Ohio bar in 1925 and commenced practice in Steubenville as an associate in the law firm of Cohen & Gardner. From 1932 to 1936, during the Great Depression, Weinman served two terms as Steubenville city solicitor, an elected post. In 1937, Weinman was elected Judge of the Court of Common Pleas for Jefferson County, Ohio. He served on the common pleas bench for 12 years before returning to private practice in 1949 as a partner and principal trial attorney in the firm of Beckman, Weinman and Anglin. During the 1950s, Weinman was a member of the state Republican committee. From 1956 to 1960, Weinman served as a member and later as chairman of the Ohio Board of Commissioners on Grievances and Discipline for the Government of the Bar of Ohio.

Federal judicial service

On July 28, 1959, Weinman was nominated by President Dwight D. Eisenhower to a seat on the United States District Court for the Southern District of Ohio vacated by Judge Lester LeFerve Cecil. Weinman was confirmed by the United States Senate on September 2, 1959, and received his commission on September 8, 1959, entering onto duty on September 28, 1959. Weinman served as Chief Judge from 1962 to 1973, assuming senior status on March 1, 1973 and continuing to hear criminal cases in that capacity until his death on February 5, 1979.

Notable cases

Among the notable cases heard by Weinman as a federal judge were the appeal of the murder conviction of Sam Sheppard; the antitrust case of Elder-Beerman Stores against the Federated Department Stores, and a lawsuit involving a mid-air collision of two airplanes which was among the first of its kind.

References

Sources
 
 

1903 births
1979 deaths
Ohio state court judges
Judges of the United States District Court for the Southern District of Ohio
United States district court judges appointed by Dwight D. Eisenhower
20th-century American judges
University of Michigan Law School alumni
20th-century American lawyers
People from Steubenville, Ohio